Yosef Levi-Sfari (Rehovot, 8 August 1972) is an Israeli diplomat.

Life
He studied laws at the Hebrew University of Jerusalem with a Master in Conflict Research, Management and Resolution in 2016 at the same university.

He was the Deputy Head of Mission and Consul at the Embassy of Israel in Montevideo, Uruguay (2007-2010) and worked for the Embassy of Israel in Ankara (2011-2015). Since 2017, he has been General Consul in Istanbul, Turkey.

References

External links
Turkey Jewish leader denies snubbing gay Israeli envoy

1972 births
Living people
Israeli consuls
Hebrew University of Jerusalem alumni
21st-century Israeli lawyers
People from Rehovot
Gay diplomats